Salty is an American family comedy-drama film directed by Ricou Browning in his feature-length directorial debut. It was written by Ricou Browning and Jack Cowden, who had previously written the 1963 film Flipper and it's subsequent television series together.

Plot
Twenty-something Taylor Reed and his teenage brother Tim Reed, whose parents were killed in a hurricane, move to rural Florida where Taylor has obtained a job at a marine life park. They hitch a ride with Clancy, an animal trader traveling by school bus to the same park, and along the way, Tim bonds with the friendly sea lion Salty. They arrive at the park operated by Mrs. Penninger and find that it has fallen on hard times. The boys and Clancy work to revive the park while adventures are had with Salty.

Cast
Mark Slade as Taylor Reed
Nina Foch as Mrs. Penninger
Julius Harris as Clancy Ames
Linda Scruggs as Wendy Lund
Clint Howard as Tim Reed
Rance Howard

Production
Filming took place in Key Biscayne and Homestead, Florida.

Promotion
Ricou Browning spoke about the film in an interview with Tom Weaver, saying, "I put a lot of heart and soul into this film, and it was a good, G-rated family film, and it turned out really well. We were publicizing it and traveling with a Winnebago that we made for the sea lion to live in, and going to TV stations and so forth. Well, the PR people sent my résumé ahead of me to these different places. We'd go into these TV studios and I wanted to talk about Salty, but from my résumé, they saw I had played the Creature, and all they wanted to talk about was the Creature! So I finally had to get the PR people to scratch that off, so I could talk about the film we just made [laughs]!"

TV series
The film was followed by the TV series Salty, which ran for one season of 20 episodes from 1974 to 1975. Julius Harris and Mark Slade reprised their roles but Clint Howard, who plays Tim Reed in the film, was replaced by Johnny Doran for the TV series.

References

External links

1973 films
1973 comedy-drama films
American comedy-drama films
Films set in Florida
Films about pinnipeds
Films shot in Florida
1973 comedy films
1973 directorial debut films
1973 drama films
1970s English-language films
1970s American films